Payson Airport  is a public airport located  west of the central business district of Payson, a town in Gila County, Arizona, United States. It is mostly used for general aviation, and is host to a number of fire-fighting aircraft during the summer fire season.

Facilities and aircraft

Facilities

Runway 6/24 measuring 5,504 x 75  ft (1,678 x 23 m)
Helipad 1 (H1) measuring 50 x 50  ft (15 x 15 m)

The airport does not have an air traffic control tower.

For the period ending 27, April 2011, the airport had 41,245 operations at an average of 113 a day. 60% transient general aviation, 36% local general aviation, 4% air taxi and <1% military.

Payson Aviation is the main provider of fixed-base operations. Payson Air also provides some services such as aircraft maintenance. They are the airport's only flight training school.

Aircraft

There are 35 aircraft based on the field. These include 30 single-engine, 3 multi-engine and 2 ultra-light gliders.

Cargo Airline

References

External links 

Payson Airport (PAN) at Arizona DOT airport directory
 

Airports in Gila County, Arizona